Going Home is a children's novel by K. M. Peyton. It was first published in 1982.

The book is set in the present day, starting in London but mostly set in Normandy, France.  It tells the story of Milly and Micky who come from a problem family.  Their father has abandoned the family and their mother has gone into hospital.  The book does not say, but it is implied the mother suffers from depression.

The children's uncle and aunt take them on a narrow boat holiday to France.  The children quickly decide they do not like it, and decide to make their own way back to England. The story details how they make their way home using their initiative and whatever resources become available.

1982 British novels
British children's novels
Novels by K. M. Peyton
Novels set in Normandy
1982 children's books